BC Kretinga is a professional basketball club based in Kretinga, Lithuania currently playing in the National Basketball League.

Current roster

Club achievements 
 2020-2021 season: RKL 1st place

References

External links
 Official website of BC Kretinga
 BC Kretinga NKLyga.lt

Basketball teams in Lithuania
Sport in Kretinga
Basketball teams established in 2006
2006 establishments in Lithuania